Dasineura crataegi, the hawthorn button-top gall-midge, is a dipteran gall-midge. It causes the hawthorn button-top gall, which develops in the terminal shoots of common hawthorn, Crataegus monogyna Jacq., Midland hawthorn C laevigata (Poir.) DC and their hybrid, C × media Bechst.  Synonyms are Perrisia crataegi and Cecidomyia crataegi (Winnertz, 1853).

Appearance of the gall

The midge induces stunted and distorted rosettes in the host by inhibiting the elongation of the shoot; the rosette is formed from many (8 to 40 or more) slightly thickened and deformed leaves with reduced petioles. Many of the leaves have small green or red ligulate excrescences or projections. The midge larvae are of an orange-red colour.

The gall is occasionally found on isolated plants, but infestation is more commonly in hedges, with the new growth resulting from hedge cutting being the site of high density populations. The rosettes stand out prominently against the sky. Old galls persist and new shoots grow from unaffected buds lying well behind the terminal bud.

Life-cycle

Adults emerge from pupae in the ground beneath the shrub and the terminal bud infestations start in March or April; the fully grown larvae fall to the ground in September or October to undergo pupation after feeding and sheltering within the leaf rosette for some time.

Distribution and control
The hawthorn button-top gall midge shows a scattered distribution throughout England, however it is an under recorded species. The gall can be controlled by spraying with insecticide at the larval stage.

Parasitoids
Aprostocetus lysippe is a hymenopteran insect of the family Eulophidae and a parasitoid of D. crataegi.

See also
 Dasineura urticae

References
Notes

Sources
 Darlington, Arnold (1968). The Pocket Encyclopaedia of Plant Galls in colour. Pub. Blandford Press. Dorset. 
 Hancy, Rex (2000). The Study of Plant Galls in Norfolk. The Norfolk and Norwich Naturalist's Society.
 Redfern, Margaret & Shirley, Peter (2002). British Plant Galls. Identification of galls on plants & fungi. AIDGAP. Shrewsbury : Field Studies Council. .
 Stubbs, F. B. Edit. (1986) Provisional Keys to British Plant Galls. Pub. Brit Plant Gall Soc. .

External links

 Images representing  Cecidomyiidae at BOLD
 Google Images. Accessed : 2010-08-26
 Taxonomy
 Nature Notes Skye & Argyll Accessed : 2010-08-26

Cecidomyiinae
Gall-inducing insects
Insects described in 1853
Nematoceran flies of Europe
Taxa named by Johannes Winnertz